A super-AGB star is a star with a mass intermediate between those that end their lives as a white dwarf and those that end with a core collapse supernova, and properties intermediate between asymptotic giant branch (AGB) stars and red supergiants.

HR diagram
These cool temperatures allow molecules to form in their photospheres and atmospheres. Super-AGB stars emit most of their light in the infra-red spectrum because of their extremely cool temperatures.

The Chandrasekhar limit and their life
A super-AGB star's core may grow to (or past) the Chandrasekhar mass because of continued hydrogen (H) and helium (He) shell burning, ending as core-collapse supernovae. The most massive super-AGB stars (at around ) are theorized to end in electron capture supernovae. The error in this determination due to uncertainties in the third dredge-up efficiency and AGB mass-loss rate could lead to about a doubling of the number of electron-capture supernovae, which also supports the theory that these stars make up 66% of the supernovae detected by satellites. 

These stars are at a similar stage in life to red giant stars, such as Aldebaran, Mira, and Chi Cygni, and are at a stage where they start to brighten, and their brightness tends to vary, along with their size and temperature. 

These stars represent a transition to the more massive supergiant stars that undergo full fusion of elements heavier than helium. During the triple-alpha process, some elements heavier than carbon are also produced: mostly oxygen, but also some magnesium, neon, and even heavier elements, gaining an oxygen-neon (ONe) core. Super-AGB stars develop partially degenerate carbon–oxygen cores that are large enough to ignite carbon in a flash analogous to the earlier helium flash. The second dredge-up is very strong in this mass range and that keeps the core size below the level required for burning of neon as occurs in higher-mass supergiants.

References

attribution contains text copied from Asymptotic giant branch available under CC-BY-SA-3.0

Asymptotic-giant-branch stars
Stellar evolution